Willie Stevenson Glanton (March 19, 1922 – July 6, 2017) was an American lawyer and politician in the state of Iowa. She toured Africa and Southeast Asia for the U.S. State Department. She was a Democrat.

Glanton was born in Hot Springs, Arkansas and attended Tennessee State University and Robert H. Terrell Law School. She moved to Iowa in 1951 and in 1953, became the second African American woman to be admitted to the Iowa Bar.  

She was elected to the Iowa House of Representatives in 1964, becoming the first African American woman to sit in that body. She resigned in 1966 to work as a lawyer with the United States Small Business Administration. 

She was married to Judge Luther T. Glanton, Jr. and had one son, Luther T., III. In 1986, she was inducted into the Iowa Women's Hall of Fame. In 2010, she was named one of the ten most influential black Iowans by The Des Moines Register. She died in Des Moines on July 6, 2017.

References

1922 births
2017 deaths
Politicians from Hot Springs, Arkansas
Tennessee State University alumni
Iowa lawyers
Women state legislators in Iowa
African-American women in politics
Democratic Party members of the Iowa House of Representatives
20th-century American politicians
20th-century American women politicians
Small Business Administration personnel
20th-century American lawyers
20th-century African-American women
20th-century African-American politicians
African-American men in politics
21st-century African-American people
21st-century African-American women